The 2016 Drivin' for Linemen 200 was the 9th stock car race of the 2016 NASCAR Camping World Truck Series, and the 16th iteration of the event. The race was held on Saturday, June 25, 2016, in Madison, Illinois, at Gateway Motorsports Park, a 1.25-mile (2.01 km) permanent tri-oval shaped racetrack. The race took the scheduled 160 laps to complete. In a wreck filled race, Christopher Bell, driving for Kyle Busch Motorsports, held off Ben Rhodes on the final restart, and earned his second career NASCAR Camping World Truck Series win, along with his first of the season. It was also the 50th NASCAR win for Kyle Busch Motorsports as an organization. To fill out the podium, Daniel Hemric, driving for Brad Keselowski Racing, would finish 3rd, respectively.

Background 

Gateway Motorsports Park is a motorsport racing facility in Madison, Illinois, just east of St. Louis, Missouri, United States, close to the Gateway Arch. It features a  oval that hosts the NASCAR Cup Series, NASCAR Craftsman Truck Series, and the NTT INDYCAR SERIES, a  infield road course used by SpeedTour TransAm, SCCA, and Porsche Club of America, a quarter-mile NHRA-sanctioned drag strip that hosts the annual NHRA Camping World Drag Racing Series Midwest Nationals event, and the Kartplex, a state-of-the-art karting facility.

Entry list 

 (R) denotes rookie driver.
 (i) denotes driver who is ineligible for series driver points.

Practice

First practice 
The first practice session was held on Saturday, June 25, at 8:30 am CST, and would last for 55 minutes.

Final practice 
The final practice session was held on Saturday, June 25, at 10:30 am CST, and would last for 1 hour and 25 minutes.

Qualifying 
Qualifying was originally going to be held on Saturday, June 25, at 4:45 pm CST. Since Gateway Motorsports Park is under 1.5 miles (2.4 km) in length, the qualifying system was a multi-car system that included three rounds. The first round was 15 minutes, where every driver would be able to set a lap within the 15 minutes. Then, the second round would consist of the fastest 24 cars in Round 1, and drivers would have 10 minutes to set a lap. Round 3 consisted of the fastest 12 drivers from Round 2, and the drivers would have 5 minutes to set a time. Whoever was fastest in Round 3 would win the pole. 

Qualifying was cancelled due to inclement weather. The starting lineup was determined by practice speeds. As a result, Ben Rhodes, driving for ThorSport Racing, would earn the pole. No drivers failed to qualify.

Starting lineup

Race results

Standings after the race 

Drivers' Championship standings

Note: Only the first 8 positions are included for the driver standings.

References 

NASCAR races at Gateway Motorsports Park
June 2016 sports events in the United States
2016 in sports in Illinois